ANPA is an acronym for:
Atrial natriuretic peptide receptor
American Neuropsychiatric Association
American Newspaper Publishers Association
ANPA-1312, text markup specification used by the above newspaper
Association of National Park Authorities